Casa Pomar is a modernist apartment building located at number 86, Carrer de Girona, Barcelona.

The building was designed by the Catalan architect Joan Rubió y Bellver (1871–1952), a pupil of Antoni Gaudí. Construction began in 1904 and was completed in 1906.

The building has a narrow facade. There is a bow window on the first floor, above which are several balconies on upper floors. The bow window's base is constructed of green ceramic tiles and wrought iron, inspired by the neo-Gothic style.

See also
 List of Modernisme buildings in Barcelona

References

External links 

Permanyer, Lluís (1992). Barcelona Modernista. Barcelona, Ediciones Polígrafo. 

Modernisme architecture in Barcelona